This is a list of Ministers of Justice of Russia.

Russian Empire

Provisional Government/Russian Republic

Russian SFSR

Russian Federation

See also
 Justice Minister
 Russian Council of Ministers
 Prosecutor General of Russia

External links
  List of Ministers of Imperial Russia (1802-1917)
  Official site of the Public Prosecutor

 
Justice
Lists of government ministers of the Soviet Union